This was a new event on the ITF Women's Circuit.

Nina Stojanović won the inaugural title, defeating Jang Su-jeong in the final, 6–3, 6–4.

Seeds

Main draw

Finals

Top half

Bottom half

References 
 Main draw

Bank of Liuzhou Cup - Singles